The Chiêu Hồi program ( (also spelled "chu hoi" or "chu-hoi" in English) loosely translated as "Open Arms") was an initiative by the U.S - Republic of Vietnam to encourage defection by the People's Army of Vietnam (PAVN) and Viet Cong (VC) and their supporters to the side of the government during the Vietnam War. According to U.S, 101,511 PAVN/VC defected under the program but one analyst speculates that less than 25% of those were genuine.

Campaign

Defection was urged by means of a propaganda campaign, usually leaflets delivered by artillery shell or dropped over enemy-controlled areas by aircraft, or messages broadcast over areas of South Vietnam. A number of incentives were offered to those who chose to cooperate, along with psychological warfare to break enemy morale.

To further this aim, invitations to defect, which also acted as safe conduct passes, were printed on clear plastic waterproof bags used to carry ammunition for the U.S. soldiers' M16 rifle. Each bag held one magazine and was sealed to prevent moisture from the jungle's humid climate from damaging the contents. When the magazine was needed during a firefight with the enemy, the bag would be torn open and discarded, in the hope that it would later be discovered by enemy troops who would read the text and consider defection.

By 1967, approximately 75,000 defections had been recorded, but analysts speculate that less than 25% of those were genuine. The program had some difficulty catching on, due in part to culture gap—errors, such as misspellings and unintentionally offensive statements—and worsened by communist reprisals against defectors and their families. To make matters worse, as testified by Sergeant Scott Camil during the 1971 Winter Soldier Investigation, the passes were sometimes ignored by U.S. forces, and their holders shot while surrendering.

Overall, however, the Chieu Hoi program was considered successful. Those who surrendered were known as "Hoi Chanh" and were often integrated into allied units as Kit Carson Scouts, operating in the same area where they had defected. Many made great contributions to the effectiveness of U.S. units, and often distinguished themselves, earning decorations as high as the Silver Star. The program was relatively inexpensive, and removed over 100,000 combatants from the field (assuming the accuracy of the numbers recorded and the sincerity of the defections).

Related people 

 Hồ Văn Châm

References

Sources

News

Reports

Further reading
Tovy, Tal. (2012). "Learning from the Past for Present Counterinsurgency Conflicts: The Chieu Hoi Program as a Case Study." Armed Forces & Society 38, No. 1: 142-163.

External links

Archival collections

Guide to the Joseph M. Carrier Collection on the Chieu Hoi Program and Vietnamese Conflict. Special Collections and Archives, The UC Irvine Libraries, Irvine, California.

Other

The Chieu Hoi Program of Vietnam
Chieu Hoi Leaflet Collection
Vietnam War "Flag" Safe Conduct Passes
Vietnam War Chieu Hoi

Vietnam War
Psychological warfare
Counterinsurgency
Military operations of the Vietnam War
Defection